Pamela Clemit, FRHistS (born 15 April 1960) is a British scholar, critic, and writer. She specializes in British literature and culture of the eighteenth and nineteenth centuries. Her work intersects with the fields of history, philosophy, and politics, and she has particular expertise in the Godwin-Shelley family of writers.

Biography 
Pamela Clemit was born at Chathill Railway Station in Northumberland to Albert Edward Clemit, the stationmaster, and his wife Violet (née Rowlands). She was educated at Seahouses County Primary School and the Duchess's Grammar School, Alnwick. She took a first-class B.A. (Hons.) degree in English Language and Literature from Mansfield College, Oxford, from where she also holds an M. Phil. She took a D. Phil in English from St Hugh's College, Oxford.

She taught at Durham University from 1989 to 2015, where she was awarded a Personal Chair in the Department of English in 2005 and held a Christopherson/Knott Foundation Fellowship in 2012-13. She is currently Professor of the Humanities at Queen Mary University of London and a Supernumerary Fellow of Wolfson College, Oxford. She was a member of the inaugural class of Fellows at the New York Public Library's Dorothy and Lewis B. Cullman Center for Scholars and Writers. She has held Visiting Fellowships at, among other places, All Souls College, Oxford; Mansfield College, Oxford; and Wadham College, Oxford.

Pamela Clemit works on the two generations of writers and thinkers influenced by the French Revolution in Britain, with a particular focus on the anarchist political philosopher and novelist William Godwin (1756-1836) and his associates. She has produced numerous scholarly and classroom editions of novels, life writing, and other works by Godwin, as well as by Elizabeth Inchbald, Charlotte Smith, and Mary Wollstonecraft Shelley. She is currently editing The Letters of William Godwin, which is being published in six volumes by Oxford University Press. Volume I: 1778-1797, for which she held a Leverhulme Major Research Fellowship, was published in 2011, and Volume II: 1798-1805 in 2014. In 2017 she led a collaborative project to digitize and make publicly available the sole surviving manuscripts of Godwin's principal works, Political Justice (1793) and Caleb Williams (1794), which are held at the Victoria and Albert Museum. Images of the manuscripts are available to view on The Shelley-Godwin Archive. She has written on letter writing as a social practice and on scholarly editing as a mode of historical enquiry. She is a regular reviewer for the Times Literary Supplement and a contributor to Tom Hodgkinson's Idler magazine.

She received the Keats-Shelley Association of America Distinguished Scholar Award for 2016. She is a Fellow of the English Association (2011), and a Fellow of the Royal Historical Society (2019).

Selected publications 

‘Godwin’s Citations, 1783-2005: Highest Renown at the Pinnacle of Disfavour’ (with Avner Offer), in New Approaches to William Godwin: Forms, Fears, Futures, ed. Eliza O’Brien et al. (London: Palgrave Macmillan, 2021), 273-96.
‘Botanical Networking: Four Holograph Letters from Charlotte Smith to James Edward Smith’ (with Brad Scott), Romanticism, 26: 1 (2020), 1-12.
‘The Signal of Regard: William Godwin’s Correspondence Networks’, European Romantic Review, 30: 4 (Aug. 2019), 1-14.
‘Letters and Journals’, in The Oxford Handbook of British Romanticism, ed. David Duff (Oxford: Oxford University Press, 2018), 418-33.
The Letters of William Godwin, Volume II: 1798-1805 (2014), ed. Pamela Clemit, in The Letters of William Godwin, gen. ed. Pamela Clemit, 6 vols. (Oxford: Oxford University Press, 2011-).
The Letters of William Godwin, Volume I: 1778-1797 (2011), ed. Pamela Clemit, in The Letters of William Godwin, gen. ed. Pamela Clemit, 6 vols. (Oxford: Oxford University Press, 2011-).
The Cambridge Companion to British Literature of the French Revolution in the 1790s, ed. Pamela Clemit (Cambridge: Cambridge University Press, 2011).
'Commerce of Luminaries: Eight Holograph Letters between William Godwin and Thomas Wedgwood', in Godwinian Moments: From the Enlightenment to Romanticism, ed. Robert M. Maniquis and Victoria Myers (Toronto: Toronto University Press, 2011), 261-82.
'Godwin's Political Justice', in The Cambridge Companion to British Literature of the French Revolution in the 1790s, ed. Pamela Clemit (Cambridge: Cambridge University Press, 2011), 86-100.
William Godwin, Caleb Williams, ed. Pamela Clemit, World's Classics (Oxford: Oxford University Press, 2009). 
‘Readers Respond to Godwin: Romantic Republicanism in Letters’, European Romantic Review, 20: 5 (Dec. 2009), 699-707. 
'William Godwin's Juvenile Library', Charles Lamb Bulletin, NS 147 (July 2009), 90-132. 
'"A Society of their Own": Four Letters from Laura Tighe Galloni d'Istria to Mary Wollstonecraft Shelley', La Questione Romantica, NS 1: 1 (June 2009), 95-109. 
'Holding Proteus: William Godwin in his Letters', in Repossessing the Romantic Past, ed. Heather Glen and Paul Hamilton (Cambridge: Cambridge University Press, 2006; paperback edn., 2010), 98-115. 
'Charlotte Smith to William and Mary Jane Godwin: Five Holograph Letters', Keats-Shelley Journal, 55 (2006), 29-40. 
‘Self-analysis as Social Critique: The Autobiographical Writings of Godwin and Rousseau’, Romanticism, 11: 2 (Autumn 2005), 161-80. 
‘William Godwin and James Watt’s Copying Machine: Wet-Transfer Copies in the Abinger Papers’, Bodleian Library Record, 18: 5 (Apr. 2005), 532-60.
‘Frankenstein and Matilda: The Legacies of Godwin and Wollstonecraft’, in The Cambridge Companion to Mary Shelley, ed. Esther Schor (Cambridge: Cambridge University Press, 2003), 26-44.
‘Life of William Godwin’, Poems, Translations, Uncollected Prose, ed. Pamela Clemit and A. A. Markley, Volume IV of Mary Shelley’s Literary Lives and Other Writings, gen. ed. Nora Crook, 4 vols., Pickering Masters Series (London: Pickering & Chatto, 2002). 
William Godwin, Memoirs of the Author of a Vindication of the Rights of Woman, ed. Pamela Clemit and Gina Luria Walker, Broadview Literary Texts (Peterborough, Ontario: Broadview Press, 2001). 
‘Two New Pamphlets by William Godwin: A Case of Computer-Assisted Authorship Attribution’ (with David Woolls), Studies in Bibliography, 54 (2001), 265-84.
‘From The Fields of Fancy to Matilda: Mary Shelley’s Changing Conception of her Novella’, Romanticism, 3: 2 (1997), 152-69.
Matilda, Dramas, Reviews & Essays, Prefaces & Notes, ed. Pamela Clemit, Volume II of Novels and Selected Works of Mary Shelley, gen. ed. Nora Crook with Pamela Clemit, 8 vols., Pickering Masters Series (London: Pickering & Chatto, 1996). 
Falkner: A Novel, ed. Pamela Clemit, Volume VII of Novels and Selected Works of Mary Shelley, gen. ed. Nora Crook with Pamela Clemit, 8 vols., Pickering Masters Series (London: Pickering & Chatto, 1996). 
Elizabeth Inchbald, A Simple Story, ed. Pamela Clemit, Penguin Classics (Harmondsworth: Penguin Books, 1996). 
William Godwin, St Leon: A Tale of the Sixteenth Century, ed. Pamela Clemit, World's Classics (Oxford: Oxford University Press, 1994). 
The Godwinian Novel: The Rational Fictions of Godwin, Brockden Brown, Mary Shelley, Oxford English Monograph Series (Oxford: Clarendon Press, 1993, reprinted, 2001). 
Educational and Literary Writings, ed. Pamela Clemit, Volume V of Political and Philosophical Writings of William Godwin, gen. ed. Mark Philp, 7 vols., Pickering Masters Series (London: Pickering & Chatto, 1993). 
Early Novels, ed. Pamela Clemit, Volume II of Collected Novels and Memoirs of William Godwin, gen. ed. Mark Philp, 8 vols., Pickering Masters Series (London: Pickering & Chatto, 1992). 
Things As They Are; or, The Adventures of Caleb Williams, ed. Pamela Clemit, Volume III of Collected Novels and Memoirs of William Godwin, gen. ed. Mark Philp, 8 vols., Pickering Masters Series (London: Pickering & Chatto, 1992). 
St Leon: A Tale of the Sixteenth Century, ed. Pamela Clemit, Volume IV of Collected Novels and Memoirs of William Godwin, gen. ed. Mark Philp, 8 vols., Pickering Masters Series (London: Pickering & Chatto, 1992). 
Fleetwood; or, The New Man of Feeling, ed. Pamela Clemit, Volume V of Collected Novels and Memoirs of William Godwin, gen. ed. Mark Philp, 8 vols., Pickering Masters Series (London: Pickering & Chatto, 1992). 
Mandeville: A Tale of the Seventeenth Century, ed. Pamela Clemit, Volume VI of Collected Novels and Memoirs of William Godwin, gen. ed. Mark Philp, 8 vols., Pickering Masters Series (London: Pickering & Chatto, 1992).

References

External links 
Queen Mary University of London departmental profile
Wolfson College, Oxford profile
University of Oxford departmental profile

Living people
Alumni of Mansfield College, Oxford
Alumni of St Hugh's College, Oxford
Alumni of Wadham College, Oxford
Fellows of Wolfson College, Oxford
Academics of Durham University
Academics of the University of Oxford
Academics of Queen Mary University of London
Fellows of the English Association
Fellows of the Royal Historical Society
1960 births
Women scholars and academics